Leave may refer to:

 Permission (disambiguation)
 Permitted absence from work
 Leave of absence, a period of time that one is to be away from one's primary job while maintaining the status of employee
 Annual leave, allowance of time away from work while continuing to be paid
 Leave (military), a period of time in which a soldier is allowed to be away from his or her assigned unit
 Leave to enter, permission for entry to the United Kingdom granted by British immigration officers
 Leave to remain, permanent residency in the United Kingdom
 Leave to appeal, granted to the loser in a court case to appeal the verdict
 Leave to prosecute, permission to bring a private prosecution of a criminal case
 Leave of the house/senate, the term used to describe unanimous consent in Westminster system parliaments
 The pro-Brexit side of the Brexit debate (opposite of "Remain")

Arts, entertainment, and media
 Leave (film), a 2010 film by Robert Celestino
 Leave (2022 film), a 2022 film by Alex Herron

Music
 Leave (album), a 2002 Mandopop album
 "Leave" (Get Out), a 2004 R&B song by JoJo
 "Leave!", a 2009 soul song performed by the English singer VV Brown
 "Leave", a song by Sertab Erener
 "Leave", a song by Lula and Bela B.
 "Leave", a song by Marieme from her self-titled EP
 "Leave", a song by Matchbox Twenty from the album Mad Season
 "Leave", a song by R.E.M. from the album New Adventures in Hi-Fi
 "LEAVE", a song by Susumu Hirasawa from the album Detonator Orgun 2
 "Leave", a song by Wavves from the album Welcome to Los Santos

People 
 Leave (gamer), gamertag of Xin Huang, professional esports player

Sports 
 Leave (cricket), the deliberate action of not hitting the ball

See also 
 
 Leaf
 Leaver (disambiguation)
 Leaves (disambiguation)
 Leaving (disambiguation)
 Left (disambiguation)